Rob Bishop is an American college baseball coach and former player. Bishop is the head coach of the South Dakota State Jackrabbits baseball team.

Playing career
Bishop enrolled at Jamestown College, to play college baseball for the Knights baseball team. As a senior in 1994, Bishop hit .439. As a sophomore in 1992 and as a senior in 1994, Bishop was named a National Association of Intercollegiate Athletics (NAIA) All-American.

Coaching career
Bishop began his coaching career a graduate assistant for the South Dakota State Jackrabbits baseball team. In 2000, Bishop received his first head coaching job at Huron University. In Bishop's lone season at Huron, he led the Screaming Eagles to a South Dakota Intercollegiate Conference (SDIC) title as well as was named the Coach of the Year. Bishop then moved on to Miles Community College, who was reviving their baseball program. Bishop led Miles to a Mon-Dak Conference championship every season he was at Miles (2001–2010). In the Fall 2010, Bishop was hired as the head baseball coach at the Montana State University Billings.

On August 1, 2016, Bishop was named the head coach at South Dakota State.

Head coaching record
The following is a record of Bishop's record at 4-year institutions.

See also
 List of current NCAA Division I baseball coaches

References

External links
South Dakota State Jackrabbits bio

Living people
Jamestown Jimmies baseball players
South Dakota State Jackrabbits baseball coaches
Miles Pioneers baseball coaches
Montana State Billings Yellowjackets baseball coaches
Year of birth missing (living people)
Junior college athletic directors in the United States